Marty Quinn is an American politician in the U.S. state of Oklahoma. He served as a member of the Oklahoma House of Representatives from 2010 to 2014 and as a member of the Oklahoma Senate from 2014 to 2022. In 2022 he was term limited from the Oklahoma Legislature.

Early life 
Quinn was born and raised in Dierks, Arkansas. He graduated from Dierks High School in 1977.

Career
Quinn owned an insurance company in Claremore until 2021. He also works as a deacon at the Blue Starr Church of Christ in Claremore, Oklahoma.

Oklahoma House of Representatives
Quinn was first elected to the Oklahoma House of Representatives in 2010. He was re-elected in 2012.

Oklahoma Senate
He announced plans to run for the Oklahoma Senate in 2014. He was an unopposed candidate for the Oklahoma Senate in that year. He was re-elected in 2018.

2022 congressional election
In 2022, Marty Quinn announced his candidacy for Oklahoma's 2nd congressional district in the 2022 United States House of Representatives elections in Oklahoma. Quinn placed 6th in the primary.

Electoral history

References

1969 births
21st-century American politicians
Businesspeople from Oklahoma
Candidates in the 2022 United States House of Representatives elections
Christians from Oklahoma
Living people
Republican Party members of the Oklahoma House of Representatives
Republican Party Oklahoma state senators
People from Claremore, Oklahoma
People from Dierks, Arkansas